The 1999 Baltimore Orioles season involved the Orioles finishing 4th in the American League East with a record of 78 wins and 84 losses.

Offseason
December 1, 1998: Charles Johnson was traded by the New York Mets to the Baltimore Orioles for Armando Benítez.
December 1, 1998: Albert Belle signed as a free agent with the Baltimore Orioles.
December 7, 1998: Will Clark signed as a free agent with the Baltimore Orioles.
December 7, 1998: B. J. Surhoff was signed as a free agent with the Baltimore Orioles.
December 11, 1998: Rich Becker was released by the Baltimore Orioles.
December 17, 1998: Doug Linton was signed as a free agent with the Baltimore Orioles.
December 21, 1998: Rich Amaral was signed as a free agent with the Baltimore Orioles.
January 15, 1999: Heathcliff Slocumb was signed as a free agent with the Baltimore Orioles.

Cuban exhibition series
In a rare event on March 28, 1999, the Orioles staged an exhibition series against the Cuban national team in Havana. The Orioles won the game 3–2 in 11 innings. They were the first Major League team to play in Cuba since 1959, when the Los Angeles Dodgers faced the Orioles in an exhibition. The Cuban team visited Baltimore in May 1999. Cuba won the second game 10–6.

Regular season

Season standings

Record vs. opponents

Notable transactions
April 30, 1999: Heathcliff Slocumb was released by the Baltimore Orioles.
June 2, 1999: Brian Roberts was drafted by the Baltimore Orioles in the 1st round (50th pick) of the 1999 amateur draft. Player signed July 14, 1999.
June 2, 1999: Érik Bédard was drafted by the Baltimore Orioles in the 6th round of the 1999 amateur draft. Player signed June 8, 1999.

Roster

Player stats

Batting

Starters by position 
Note: Pos = Position; G = Games played; AB = At bats; H = Hits; Avg. = Batting average; HR = Home runs; RBI = Runs batted in

Other batters 
Note: G = Games played; AB = At bats; H = Hits; Avg. = Batting average; HR = Home runs; RBI = Runs batted in

Pitching

Starting pitchers 
Note: G = Games pitched; IP = Innings pitched; W = Wins; L = Losses; ERA = Earned run average; SO = Strikeouts

Other pitchers 
Note: G = Games pitched; IP = Innings pitched; W = Wins; L = Losses; ERA = Earned run average; SO = Strikeouts

Relief pitchers 
Note: G = Games pitched; W = Wins; L = Losses; SV = Saves; ERA = Earned run average; SO = Strikeouts

Farm system

References

External links
1999 Baltimore Orioles team at Baseball-Reference
1999 Baltimore Orioles season at baseball-almanac.com

Baltimore Orioles seasons
Baltimore Orioles season
Baltimore